Equus simplicidens. sometimes called the Hagerman horse is an extinct species of equine native to North America during the Pliocene. It is one of the oldest and most primitive members of the genus Equus. Abundant remains of it were discovered in 1928 in Hagerman, Idaho. It is the state fossil of Idaho.

Classification
 
The Hagerman horse was given the scientific name of Plesippus shoshonensis in 1930 by a Smithsonian paleontologist named James W. Gidley who led the initial excavations at Hagerman that same year.

However further study by other paleontologists determined that fossils closely resembled fossils of a primitive horse from Texas named Equus simplicidens, named by paleontologist Edward Drinker Cope in 1892. Because of this similarity, the two forms were interpreted to be the same species, and since the name Equus simplicidens was the older name, it was retained following the taxonomic Principle of Priority. The Hagerman fossils represent some of the oldest widely accepted remains of the genus Equus.

Discovery
A cattle rancher named Elmer Cook discovered some fossil bones on this land in Hagerman, Idaho. In 1928, he showed them to Dr. H. T. Stearns of the U.S. Geological Survey who then passed them on to Dr. James W. Gidley at the Smithsonian Institution. Identified as bones belonging to an extinct horse, the area where the fossils were discovered, called the Hagerman Horse Quarry, was excavated and three tons of specimens were sent back to the Smithsonian in Washington, D.C.

Excavation of the fossils continued into the early 1930s. Ultimately five nearly complete skeletons, more than 100 skulls, and forty-eight lower jaws as well as numerous isolated bones were found. Some paleontologists believed that such a large amount of fossils found in one location was because of the quarry area being a watering hole at one point. The waterhole could have been where the bones of the Hagerman horses accumulated as injured, old, and ill animals, drawn to water, died there. Other paleontologists think that an entire herd of these animals drowned attempting to ford a flooded river and were swept away in the current and ended up buried in the soft sand at the bottom.

Taxonomy 
The genus placement of the species controversial, with some authors choosing to place the species in Plesippus instead. A 2019 phylogenetic analysis found it to be more closely related to living Equus than to Hippidion or Dinohippus, but outside the group containing all living equines. Some authors have argued for a close relationship of Equus simplicidens with living zebras to the exclusion of other living equines, but these claims have been considered equivocal by others, who note that many "stenonine horses" from Eurasia exhibit similarities to zebras.

See also
Equus scotti

References

 The Hagerman Horse Quarry
 Hagerman Fossil Beds' Critter Corner - Hagerman Horse - Equus simplicidens, Dr. Greg McDonald

Further reading
 Boss, N. H. "Explorations for Fossil Horses in Idaho". Explorations and Field Work of the Smithsonian Institution in 1931. 1932.
 Gazin, C. L. '" Study of the Fossil Horse Remains from the Upper Pliocene of Idaho. Proceedings from the United States National Museum 83(2,985): 281-320. 1936.
 MacFadden, Bruce J. Fossil Horses: Systematics, Paleobiology and Evolution of the Family Equidae. Cambridge Univ. Press, 1992.
 McDonald, H. Gregory. "More than Just Horses", Rocks and Minerals, September/October 1993. Vol. 68:322-326.
 Willoughby, David P. The Empire of Equus''. A.S. Barnes and Co., 1974
 Castle Rock Ranch – Hagerman Horse Quarry Land Exchange Environmental Assessment

Pliocene horses
Prehistoric mammals of North America
Pliocene odd-toed ungulates
Pliocene first appearances
Pleistocene extinctions
Pleistocene horses
Pliocene mammals of North America
Pleistocene mammals of North America
Equus (genus)
Extinct animals of the United States
Taxa named by Edward Drinker Cope
Fossil taxa described in 1892
Symbols of Idaho